The Drop is a steel sculpture resembling a raindrop designed by the group of German artists known as Inges Idee, located at Bon Voyage Plaza in the Coal Harbour neighborhood of downtown Vancouver. According to Inges Idee, the sculpture is "an homage to the power of nature" and represents "the relationship and outlook towards the water that surrounds us". The Drop was commissioned as part of the 2009 Vancouver Convention Centre Art Project and is owned by BC Pavco.

Description and history
The central "spine" of the sculpture is composed of steel and covered with Styrofoam and blue polyurethane. The piece's color complements the sky and contrasts with the large yellow sulfur piles visible on the opposite shoreline.

The Drop was commissioned as part of the Vancouver Convention Centre Art Project and marked the first North American project for Inges Idee, a group of four German artists. The sculpture was installed in 2009 at Bon Voyage Plaza (adjacent to the Vancouver Convention Centre) at the end of Burrard Street, along the waterfront in the Coal Harbour neighborhood of downtown Vancouver. The piece was removed temporarily during the 2010 Winter Olympics for interrupting the view of the television cameras.

Reception
The Vancouver Observer referred to the sculpture as the "quintessential Vancouver piece". According to the publication, The Drop has a "playful relationship with the viewer" and serves as a "big inside joke" for Vancouver residents. This refers to the high amount of rain the city receives; Vancouver is Canada's third most rainy large city, after Abbotsford and Halifax, with over 162 rainy days per year.

References

External links

 Vancouver Convention Centre Art Project

2009 establishments in British Columbia
2009 sculptures
Coal Harbour
Outdoor sculptures in Vancouver
Steel sculptures in Canada
Tourist attractions in Vancouver
Works by German people